Steve de Shazer (June 25, 1940, Milwaukee – September 11, 2005, Vienna) was a psychotherapist, author, and developer and pioneer of solution focused brief therapy.  In 1978, he founded the Brief Family Therapy Center (BFTC) in Milwaukee, Wisconsin with his wife Insoo Kim Berg.

De Shazer was originally trained as a classical musician and worked as a jazz saxophonist. He received a Bachelor in Fine Arts and an MSSW in Social Work from the University of Wisconsin–Milwaukee. He never studied at the Mental Research Institute in Palo Alto, California, even though some rumours have it he did. De Shazer wrote six books and was translated into 14 languages. He was a lifelong friend of John Weakland , whom he saw as his mentor. 

De Shazer died in Vienna while traveling on a training and consulting tour in Europe. De Shazer has a nephew, Tony de Shazer and two great nieces Elodie and Amelie de Shazer.

Solution-focused heritage

Solution-Focused Brief Therapy 
In 1978, de Shazer and Insoo Kim Berg co-founded the Brief Family Therapy Center (BFTC) in Milwaukee. With this move, the couple are recognized as the primary developers of solution-focused brief therapy, which emerged from research they conducted at the BFTC in the 1980s, building upon studies conducted at the Mental Research Institute.

BFTC served as a research center to study, develop, and test techniques of psychotherapy to find those that are most efficient and effective with clients. The team at BFTC was very diverse, with practitioners with various backgrounds, educations, and academic disciplines. Besides mental health professionals, the team included educators, sociologists, linguists, and even engineers and philosophers. Steve de Shazer, the director of BFTC, referred to this group as a "therapeutic think tank". Over time people began to request training, so BFTC became a research and training center.

Solution-Focused Applied Psychology (SoFAP) 
Alongside the popular development of the practical application of solution-focused therapy, its theoretic foundation has been the topic of research in an academic context. The academic discipline of Solution-Focused Applied Psychology (SoFAP) uses the methodology offered by design science to investigate the epistemology that underlies the application of the solution-focused approach. In  intuitive form, this approach was originally recognized in the practice of Dr. Milton H. Erickson and subsequently concretized by de Shazer and Berg, particularly in de Shazer's book Patterns of Brief Family Therapy: An Ecosystemic Approach.

References

External links
Brief Family Therapy Center 
Social Construction Therapy Online
Interview with Steve de Shazer and Insoo Kim Berg MRI/BFTC conference The Global Reach Of Brief Therapy, Sunny Vale CA, 26–27 August 1994.

1940 births
2005 deaths
American psychology writers
American male non-fiction writers
American psychotherapists
Family therapists
Writers from Milwaukee
University of Wisconsin–Milwaukee alumni
20th-century American male writers